The Dicastery for Institutes of Consecrated Life and Societies of Apostolic Life, formerly called Congregation for Institutes of Consecrated Life and Societies of Apostolic Life (CICLSAL), is the dicastery of the Roman Curia with competency over everything which concerns institutes of consecrated life (orders and religious congregations, both of men and of women, as well as secular institutes) and societies of apostolic life, regarding their government, discipline, studies, goods, rights, and privileges.

Description
On 26 May 1587, Pope Sixtus IV founded the Sacred Congregation for Consultations About Regulars. In 1908 Pope Pius X changed its name to the Congregation for Religious. In 1967 Pope Paul VI changed its name to the Congregation for Religious and Secular Institutes. Pope Francis gave the Congregation its current name with the March 19, 2022 apostolic constitution Praedicate evangelium.

The Congregation is responsible for everything which concerns religious orders and congregations, and societies of apostolic life regarding their government, discipline, studies, etc. It is competent also for matters regarding hermits, consecrated virgins, and new forms of consecrated life. It has no territorial limits, although certain questions may be remanded to other Vatican Congregations. The Congregation also handles matters concerning associations of the faithful formed with the intention of becoming institutes of consecrated life or societies of apostolic life, and for Third Orders Seculars.

In 1994, the Congregation noted,"In some places it seems that religious community has lost its relevance in the eyes of women and men religious and is perhaps no longer an ideal to be pursued. ...In many countries, increased state programs in areas in which religious have traditionally been active—such as social service, education and health—together with the decrease in vocations, have resulted in a diminished presence of religious in works which used to be typically those of apostolic institutes. ...it is necessary to have religious communities with a clear charismatic identity, assimilated and lived, capable of transmitting them to others and disposed to share them, religious communities with an intense spirituality and missionary enthusiasm for communicating the same spirit and the same evangelizing thrust; religious communities who know how to animate and encourage lay people to share the charism of their institute, according to their secular character and according to their different style of life, inviting them to discover new ways of making the same charism and mission operative."

On the Feast of the Presentation of the Blessed Virgin Mary, 21 November 2014 Pope Francis declared a "Year of Consecrated Life" to begin on 30 November 2014, the First Sunday of Advent and continue to the Feast of the Presentation of Jesus at the Temple, 2 February 2016. The Congregation for Institutes of Consecrated Life and for Societies of Apostolic Life planned a number of initiatives to facilitate encounters between members of different expressions of consecrated and fraternal life in the various Churches.

Pope Francis addressed the Congregation in January 2017 on the theme of "Fidelity and perseverance" saying, "it is clear that one must first let oneself be evangelised in order to engage in evangelisation."

Institute of consecrated life

Institutes of consecrated life are canonically erected institutes in the Roman Catholic Church whose members profess the evangelical counsels by vows of chastity, poverty, and obedience. There are two types:

Religious institutes
Religious institutes are characterized by the public profession of vows, communal life, and a degree of separation from the world.

Orders
Some Institutes are called Orders. These are Institutes in which, for historical reasons or because of their character or nature, solemn vows are made by at least some of the members. All members of these orders are called regulars (because they are governed by a Rule (i.e. regula)), and if they are women they are called nuns ("moniales"). The orders are older than the congregations.

Congregations
Other religious institutes are called congregations. Their members make simple vows; women are called sisters.

Secular institutes
A secular institute is an organization of consecrated individuals who, unlike members of a religious institute who live in community, live in the world, and work for the sanctification of the world from within.

Institutes may also be classified as a "clerical" or "lay institute" depending on whether the members exercise Holy Orders.(can. 588.2, and (can. 588.3).

Society of apostolic life

A society of apostolic life is a group of men or women within the Catholic Church who have come together for a specific purpose and live fraternally.

Both Institutes of Consecrated Life and Societies of Apostolic Life need the written approval of a bishop to operate within his diocese, although a diocesan bishop can establish an institute of consecrated life or society in his own territory, after consulting the Apostolic See.

Leadership

The current Prefect is João Cardinal Braz de Aviz. The current Secretary is Archbishop José Rodríguez Carballo, O.F.M. The two Undersecretaries of the Congregation have been Father Pier Luigi Nava, S.S.M. since 27 November 2018 and Sister Carmen Ros Nortes, a member of the Sisters of Our Lady of Consolation, since 23 February 2018.

On 8 July 2019, in naming 21 new members to the Congregation, Pope Francis included women for the first time. all seven of them were superiors of their orders: Six are leaders of international religious orders, and one leads an institute of consecrated laywomen: Kathleen Appler, Yvonne Reungoat, Françoise Massy, Luigia Coccia, Simona Brambilla, Rita Calvo Sanz and Olga Krizova. Catherine Clifford, of Saint Paul University in Ottawa, said "The recent move of Pope Francis represents a new and significant development in that it would give women a deliberative voice in the governing body of the congregation, which until now has been the domain of cardinals, bishops, and the heads of men's religious orders."

Cardinal Prefects since 1908

Secretaries since 1908

See also
 Perfectae caritatis, Decree on the Adaptation and Renewal of Religious Life
 Exclaustration, which is granted by the congregation

References

External links

GCatholic.org
 The Congregation for Institutes of Consecrated Life and Societies of Apostolic Life
 Letter of Pope Francis to consecrated men and women regarding the Year of Consecrated Life (2015) 

 
1586 establishments in the Papal States
Religious organizations established in the 1580s
Catholic organizations established in the 16th century